Plasmalemma vesicle-associated protein is a protein that in humans is encoded by the PLVAP gene.

References

Further reading